Nikolaj Ehlers (born 14 February 1996) is a Danish professional ice hockey forward for the Winnipeg Jets of the National Hockey League (NHL). Ehlers previously played ice hockey in Switzerland, where his father Heinz was a coach, and then moved to North America in 2013 to play with the Halifax Mooseheads of the Quebec Major Junior Hockey League (QMJHL). After one year with Halifax he was selected ninth overall by the Jets in the 2014 NHL Entry Draft, and spent one more season in juniors before making the NHL in 2015. 

Internationally Ehlers has played for Denmark at both the junior and senior level, including at three World Championships.

Playing career

Junior
Ehlers played youth and junior hockey in Switzerland within the EHC Biel organization. He played in the 2009 Quebec International Pee-Wee Hockey Tournament with the Swiss Eastern team. He made his National League A debut at age 16 (and was thus the youngest player in the league at the time), playing with the senior EHC Biel squad during the 2012–13 NLA season, one which he predominantly spent playing with the U20 team.

After being drafted sixth overall by the Halifax Mooseheads in the 2013 CHL Import Draft, Ehlers joined the team in the Quebec Major Junior Hockey League for the 2013–14 season. Following a strong start to the season, he received a top-25 (number 22) mid-term ranking amongst North American skaters for the 2014 NHL Draft.

On 2 September 2014, the Jets announced that they had signed Ehlers to a three-year entry level contract. Ehlers was returned to junior for a second season with the Halifax Mooseheads for the 2014–15 season. Ehlers finished third in QMJHL regular season scoring in posting back-to-back 100 point seasons. Ehlers was leading the QMJHL in playoff scoring upon elimination with 31 points in just 14 games.

Professional
On 22 April 2015, Ehlers was recalled to the Winnipeg Jets post-season run which ended the same day. Ehlers returned to the Jets training camp for the 2015–16 season and started the regular season with the team, playing in his first NHL game on 8 October 2015 in Boston. He scored his first NHL goal against the New York Rangers at the Madison Square Garden on 13 October 2015. He scored his first NHL hat-trick on 26 January 2016 against the Arizona Coyotes in Winnipeg. On 4 October 2017, Ehlers signed a seven-year extension with the Jets.

International play

Internationally, Ehlers has played for the Danish U18 national team at the 2013 IIHF World U18 Championships Division I-A tournament and the U20 national team at the Division I-A grouping of the 2014 World Junior Ice Hockey Championships. He largely contributed to helping Denmark gain promotion in each tournament.

Personal life
Ehlers was born in Denmark but moved to Germany at a young age while his father, Heinz, played hockey there. Heinz played in several leagues in Europe, and was selected by the New York Rangers in the 1984 NHL Entry Draft, though he never played in North America. After his playing career Heinz became a coach, and currently is the head coach of the SCL Tigers in the Swiss National League A. Ehlers would later move back to Denmark for several years, and then to Switzerland in 2007 when his father took up a coaching position. Sebastian Ehlers, Nikolaj's older brother by three years, is currently playing for the Odense Bulldogs  in the AL-Bank Ligaen, the top league in Denmark. He also has a younger sister, Caroline. Charlotte Checkers centre Alexander True is Ehlers' cousin.

Career statistics

Regular season and playoffs

International

Awards and honours

References

External links

 

1996 births
Living people
Danish ice hockey forwards
EHC Biel players
Halifax Mooseheads players
National Hockey League first-round draft picks
Sportspeople from Aalborg
Winnipeg Jets draft picks
Winnipeg Jets players
Danish expatriates in Germany
Danish expatriate sportspeople in Switzerland
Danish expatriate sportspeople in Canada
Danish expatriate ice hockey people
Expatriate ice hockey players in Canada
Expatriate ice hockey players in Switzerland